Alexandra Viney is an Australian Paralympic rower. She was a member of the PR3 Mix 4+ at the 2020 Tokyo Paralympics.

Personal 
Viney was born on 10 June 1992. She attended Launceston Grammar School. The accident resulted in her with long term impairments to her left elbow, forearm and hand. She has graduated with Bachelor of Exercise and Sport Science (Sports Nutrition) from Deakin University, and is now studying to earn a Master of Business (Sports Management). Viney operates a small business.

Rowing 
Viney was a promising young rower throughout her high school years at Launceston Grammar. In May 2018, it was suggested that she take up para rowing and in November 2018 sat in a boat for the first time. In May 2019, she debuted for Australia at the Gavirate International Para Regatta placing second in the PR3 Mix 4+ and fourth place at her first 2019 World Rowing Championships.

At the 2020 Summer Paralympics, Viney was a member of the PR3 Mix 4+ consisting of Tom Birtwhistle, James Talbot, Nikki Ayers and herself. Their cox was Renae Domaschenz. They qualified for the final after winning their Repechage with time of 7:06.98 but came fourth in the final and failed to win a medal.

Viney with Alex Vuillermin won the silver medal in the PR3 W2- at the 2022 World Rowing Championships. With  Jessica Gallagher, James Talbot, Tom Birthwhistle and Teesaan Koo (cox) finished fourth in the PR3 Mixed Coxed Four.

In 2021, Viney is a member of Mercantile Rowing Club

References

External links 

1992 births
Living people
Rowers at the 2020 Summer Paralympics
Paralympic rowers of Australia
Australian female rowers
Sportspeople from Launceston, Tasmania
21st-century Australian women